The Metropolitan Detention Center, Guaynabo (MDC Guaynabo) is a United States federal prison facility in Guaynabo, Puerto Rico which holds male and female inmates of all security levels who are awaiting trial or sentencing. It is operated by the Federal Bureau of Prisons, a division of the United States Department of Justice.

In the wake of the destruction of Hurricane Maria in September 2017, some 1200 federal prisoners were transferred from Guaynabo to the Federal Correctional Institution, Yazoo City in Mississippi.  Those 1200 were returned to Guaynabo in the first quarter of 2018, along with other prisoners who had been temporarily held in Atlanta, Georgia, Talladega Alabama, and Miami, Florida.

Notable incidents
In 2010, an FBI investigation uncovered a conspiracy to distribute cocaine, heroin, marijuana, Percocet, and Xanax to an inmate at MDC Guaynabo. Several conspirators, led by Juan Rios-Ortiz, also attempted to provide cellular telephones, chargers, and SIM cards to an inmate of MDC. Rios-Ortiz worked for a company that had a contract to supply produce to the prison kitchen. Rios-Ortiz was subsequently convicted of conspiracy to distribute controlled substances, distribution of controlled substances, and providing contraband to an inmate of a federal prison.

On February 26, 2013, Osvaldo Albarati, a lieutenant for the Federal Bureau of Prisons, was shot and killed in what is believed to be retaliation for his investigations into cellphone smuggling at MDC Guaynabo. He had just left the facility and was driving home when several gunmen opened fire on his vehicle on the De Diego Expressway near Bayamon.  Albarati worked in the investigative branch at the prison, where he was responsible for investigating crime within the prison, including drug smuggling and illegal cellphone use. Authorities have said his killing may have been contracted by powerful drug kingpins being held at the facility in reprisal for recent seizures he spearheaded. The FBI investigated the killing and no charges were filed.

On March 24, 2020 as a result of the COVID-19 pandemic, the prison reported that it was operating on a modified schedule and inmates were not allowed visitors.

Notable Inmates (current and former)

See also

 List of U.S. federal prisons
 Federal Bureau of Prisons
 Incarceration in the United States

References

External links

 MDC Guaynabo - Federal Bureau of Prisons

Buildings and structures in Guaynabo, Puerto Rico
1993 establishments in Puerto Rico
Guaynabo, Puerto Rico
Prisons in Puerto Rico
Guaynabo